Poimenesperus villiersi is a species of beetle in the family Cerambycidae. It was described by Lepesme in 1947.

References

velutinus
Beetles described in 1947